The Wages of Sin originates from the starting of the biblical verse Romans 6:23 "For the wages of sin is death, but the gift of God is eternal life in Christ Jesus our Lord."

It may also refer to:

Film & television
 The Wages of Sin (1918 film), a British silent drama film 
 The Wages of Sin (1929 film), a drama film 
 The Wages of Sin (1938 film), a drama film 
 The Wages of Sin (1956 film), a French drama film 
 The Wages of Sin (Upstairs, Downstairs), an episode of the British television series Upstairs, Downstairs

Literature
 The Wages of Sin, an 1891 novel by British author Lucas Malet
 The Wages of Sin (novel), a 1999 Doctor Who book by David A. McIntee
 Educated Youth (novel), a 1991 Chinese novel by Ye Xin, also translated as The Wages of Sin

Music
 Wages of Sin, a 2001 album by death metal group Arch Enemy
 The Wages of Sin, a 2019 digital release by English musician Pig

Other
 SiN: Wages of Sin, a 1999 expansion for the first person video game SiN